Amber, also called Ambar, is a 1952 Hindi costume action romance thriller film directed by Jayant Desai. The story was by Dwarka Khosla and Bachoobhai Shukla, with dialogues by Munshi Sagar Hussain and Arjun Dev Rashk. The screenplay was credited to Uma Devi. The film was produced by Seth Jagat Narain for his banner, Jagat Pictures, with music by Ghulam Mohammed. 
The actress Tanuja was credited as Baby Tanuja and played the role of a young Nargis. The film starred Raj Kapoor, Nargis, Agha, Bipin Gupta, Vyas, Cuckoo, Helen and Samson.

The story involves intrigue in a palace, a king blamed for a murder and a daughter avenging her father's death. Nargis plays Amber, out for revenge, while Raj Kapoor plays the man sent to save the king.

Plot
Amber (Baby Tanuja), a young orphaned tribal girl, stays with her maternal grandfather, who is the Chief. She learns that her father was a prince who had married her mother but was killed. The cause of the murder was unknown, and the killers were never caught. Her mother had committed suicide soon after. The grandfather sends her to the palace to stay with her paternal grandfather, the King (Bipin Gupta). The King comes to love Amber, and she grows up (Nargis) surrounded by love and luxury. However, she is let known through palace intrigue that her grandfather, the King, had got her father killed. She decides to avenge her father's death by killing her grandfather. Ambar, on one of her outings, meets Raj (Raj Kapoor), and the two fall in love. Raj turns out to be a bandit, but his father is a loyal server to the king. Raj's father fears that someone is going to harm the king, so he sends Raj to the palace. Raj arrives there pretending to be a teacher.

The King's minister, Diwanji (Ramesh Sinha) and his son Johar (Nayampally), are also plotting to kill the King and take over the kingdom.  Raj, meanwhile, starts suspecting Amber of harbouring murderous intentions towards her grandfather. One night, intent on killing the King, Amber goes to his chambers. The Diwanji is already there with plans to kill the King, too; the ensuing chaos brings everyone to the royal chambers, and Amber is caught. Raj gathers an army and saves the King and Amber. Finally, everything is revealed with the Diwan and his son being found out as the real murderers of Amber's father, the Prince.

Cast
 Raj Kapoor as Raj
 Nargis as Princess Amber
 Bipin Gupta as the Maharaja
 Agha as Veenu Bilasi
 Ramesh Sinha as Diwanji
 Nayampally as Johar
 B. M. Vyas as Raj's Father
 Tanuja as Young Amber
 Cuckoo as the singer, dancer
 Helen as a chorus singer dancer
 Tun Tun
 Samson

Soundtrack
One of the popular songs from the film was "Hum Tum Yeh Bahar, Dekho Rang Laya Pyar", sung by Lata Mangeshkar and Mohammed Rafi. The music was composed by Ghulam Mohammed with lyrics written by Shakeel Badayuni. The playback singing was provided by Lata Mangeshkar, Mohammed Rafi and Shamshad Begum.

Songlist

References

External links
 

1952 films
1950s Hindi-language films
Films directed by Jayant Desai
Indian action thriller films
1950s action thriller films
Indian black-and-white films